Maurice Piron (1914–1986) was a Belgian academic and philologist.

1914 births
1986 deaths
Academic staff of the University of Liège
Belgian philologists
Walloon movement activists
20th-century philologists